Bacon's Rebellion was an armed rebellion held by Virginia settlers that took place from 1676 to 1677. It was led by Nathaniel Bacon against Colonial Governor William Berkeley, after Berkeley refused Bacon's request to drive Native Americans out of Virginia. Thousands of Virginians from all classes (including those in indentured servitude) and races rose up in arms against Berkeley, chasing him from Jamestown and ultimately torching the settlement. The rebellion was first suppressed by a few armed merchant ships from London whose captains sided with Berkeley and the loyalists. Government forces arrived soon after and spent several years defeating pockets of resistance and reforming the colonial government to be once more under direct Crown control.

Bacon's rebellion was the first rebellion in the North American colonies in which discontented frontiersmen took part (a somewhat similar uprising in Maryland involving John Coode and Josias Fendall took place shortly afterward). The alliance between European indentured servants and Africans (a mix of indentured, enslaved, and Free Negroes) disturbed the colonial upper class. They responded by hardening the racial caste of slavery in an attempt to divide the two races from subsequent united uprisings with the passage of the Virginia Slave Codes of 1705. While the rebellion did not succeed in the initial goal of driving the Native Americans from Virginia, it did result in Berkeley being recalled to England.

Prelude 
Starting in the 1650s, colonists began squatting on frontier land in the Northern Neck of Virginia, land which had been reserved by the Crown for Native Americans since 1634. Secocowon (then known as Chicacoan), Doeg, Patawomeck and Rappahannock natives began moving into the region as well and joined local tribes in defending their land and resources. In July 1666, the colonists declared war on them. By 1669, colonists had patented the land on the west of the Potomac as far north as My Lord's Island (now Theodore Roosevelt Island in Washington, D.C.). By 1670, they had driven most of the Doeg out of the Virginia colony and into Maryland—apart from those living beside the Nanzatico/Portobago in Caroline County, Virginia.

Motives 

Bacon's followers used the rebellion as an effort to gain government recognition of the shared interests among all social classes of the colony in protecting the "commonality" and advancing its  welfare. However, not every class's welfare was looked after in this rebellion. Both Native American women and European women played major roles in Bacon's Rebellion as less noted members of society.  However, the primary disagreement between Bacon and his followers and Berkeley was in how to handle the Native American population. Berkeley believed that it would be useful to keep some as subjects, stating, "I would have preserved those Indians that I knew were hoeurly at our mercy to have beene our spies and intelligence to find out the more bloudy Ennimies", whereas Bacon found this approach too compassionate, stating, "Our Design [is] ... to ruin and extirpate all Indians in General."

Rebellion 
In July 1675, Doeg Indians in Stafford County, Virginia, killed two settlers and destroyed fields of corn and cattle. The Stafford County militia tracked down the raiders, killing 10 Doeg in a cabin. Meanwhile, another militia, led by Colonel Mason, attacked a nearby cabin of the friendly Susquehannock tribe and killed 14 of them. The attack ceased only when someone from the cabin managed to escape and confront Mason, telling him that they were not Doegs. On August 31, Virginia Governor William Berkeley proclaimed that the Susquehannock had been involved in the Stafford County attack with the Doeg. On September 26, 1,000 members of Maryland militia led by commander Thomas Truman marched to the Susquehannock stronghold in Maryland. Truman invited five Susquehannock chiefs to a parley. After they denied responsibility for the July attacks in Stafford County, they were seized and executed. The Susquehannocks retaliated in January 1676 with attacks on plantations, killing 60 settlers in Maryland and a further 36 in Virginia. Other tribes joined in, killing settlers, burning houses and fields and slaughtering livestock as far as the James and York.

When Sir William Berkeley refused to retaliate against the Native Americans' raids, farmers gathered at the report of a new raiding party. Nathaniel Bacon arrived with a quantity of brandy; after it was distributed, he was elected leader. Against Berkeley's orders, the group struck south until they came to the Occaneechi people. In May, after convincing the Occaneechi warriors to leave and attack the Susquehannock, Bacon and his men murdered most of the Occaneechi men, women, and children remaining at the village. Upon their return, Bacon's faction discovered that Berkeley had called for new elections to the House of Burgesses to better address the Native American raids.

The recomposed House of Burgesses enacted a number of sweeping reforms, known as Bacon's Laws. Bacon was not serving his duty in the House; rather, he was at his plantation miles away. It limited the powers of the governor and restored suffrage to landless freemen.

After passage of these laws, Nathaniel Bacon arrived with 500 followers in Jamestown to demand a commission to lead militia against the Native Americans. The governor, however, refused to yield to the pressure. When Bacon had his men take aim at Berkeley, he responded by "baring his breast" to Bacon and told Bacon to shoot him. Seeing that the governor would not be moved, Bacon then had his men take aim at the assembled burgesses, who quickly granted Bacon his commission. Bacon had earlier been promised a commission before he retired to his estate if he maintained "good" behavior for two weeks. While Bacon was at Jamestown with his small army, eight colonists were killed on the frontier in Henrico County (from whence he marched) owing to a lack of manpower on the frontier.

On July 30, 1676, Bacon and his army issued the "Declaration of the People". The declaration criticized Berkeley's administration in detail. It leveled several accusations against Berkeley:
 that "upon specious pretense of public works [he] raised great unjust taxes upon the commonality";
 that he advanced favorites to high public offices;
 that he monopolized the beaver trade with the Native Americans;
 that he was pro-Native American.

After months of conflict, Bacon's forces, numbering 300–500 men, moved on Jamestown, which was occupied by Berkeley's forces, besieging the town. Bacon's men captured and burned to the ground the colonial capital on September 19. Outnumbered, Berkeley retreated across the river. His group encamped at Warner Hall, home of the speaker of the House of Burgesses, Augustine Warner Jr., and caused considerable damage, although the house was left standing.

Before a Royal Navy squadron led by Thomas Larimore could arrive to aid Berkeley and his forces, Bacon died on October 26 from dysentery. John Ingram took over leadership of the rebellion, but many followers drifted away. The rebellion did not last long after that. Berkeley launched a series of successful amphibious attacks across the Chesapeake Bay and defeated the rebels. His forces defeated the small pockets of insurgents spread across the Tidewater. Thomas Grantham, captain of the ship Concord cruising the York River, used cunning and force to disarm the rebels. He tricked his way into the garrison of the rebellion and promised to pardon everyone involved once they got back onto the ship. However, once they were safely in the hold, he turned the ship's guns on them and disarmed the rebellion. Through various other tactics, the other rebel garrisons were likewise overcome.

Impact 

The 71-year-old governor Berkeley returned to the burned capital and a looted home at the end of January 1677. His wife described their Green Spring Plantation in a letter to her cousin:

It looked like one of those the boys pull down at Shrovetide, and was almost as much to repair as if it had been new to build, and no sign that ever there had been a fence around it...

Bacon's wealthy landowning followers returned their loyalty to the Virginia government after Bacon's death. Governor Berkeley returned to power. He seized the property of several rebels for the colony and executed 23 men by hanging, including the former governor of the Albemarle Sound colony, William Drummond, and the collector of customs, Giles Bland.

After an investigative committee returned its report to King Charles II, Berkeley was relieved of the governorship and recalled to England. According to historian Alan Taylor, "Because the tobacco trade generated a crown revenue of about £5–£10 per laboring man, King Charles II wanted no rebellion to distract the colonists from raising the crop." Charles II was reported to have commented, "That old fool has put to death more people in that naked country than I did here for the murder of my father."  No record of the king's comments have been found, and the origin of the story appears to have been colonial legend that arose at least 30 years after the events.  The king prided himself on the clemency he had shown to his father's enemies. Berkeley left his wife, Frances Berkeley, in Virginia and returned to England. She sent a letter to let him know that the current governor was making a bet that the king would refuse to receive him. However, William Berkeley died in July 1677, shortly after he landed in England.

In order for the Virginia elite to maintain the loyalty of the common planters in order to avert future rebellions, historian Alan Taylor writes, they "needed to lead, rather than oppose, wars meant to dispossess and destroy frontier Indians." According to Taylor, this bonded the elite to the common planter in wars against Indians, their common enemy, and enabled the elites to appease free whites with land. Taylor writes, "To give servants greater hope for the future, in 1705 the assembly revived the headright system by promising each freedman fifty acres of land, a promise that obliged the government to continue taking land from the Indians."

Bacon promised his army tax breaks, predetermined wages, and freedom from indentures, "so long as they should serve under his colors." Indentured servants both black and white had joined the frontier rebellion. Seeing them united in a cause alarmed the ruling class. Historians believe the rebellion hastened the hardening of racial lines associated with slavery, as a way for planters and the colony to control some of the poor. For example, historian Eric Foner writes, "The fear of civil war among whites frightened Virginia's ruling elite, who took steps to consolidate power and improve their image: for example, restoration of property qualifications for voting, reducing taxes, and adoption of a more aggressive American Indian policy." Some of these measures, by appeasing the poor white population, may have hoped to mitigate any future unification with the enslaved black population.

Historiography 
In 1676, Ann Cotton wrote a personal account of Bacon's Rebellion. Her account was in the form of a letter written in 1676 and published in its original form in 1804 in the Richmond Enquirer under the title, An account of our late troubles in Virginia.

Historians question whether the rebellion by Bacon against Berkeley in 1676 had any lasting significance for the more-successful American Revolution a century later. The most idolizing portrait of Bacon is found in Torchbearer of the Revolution (1940) by Thomas Jefferson Wertenbaker, which one scholar in 2011 called "one of the worst books on Virginia that a reputable scholarly historian ever published."  The central area of debate is Bacon's controversial character and complex disposition, as illustrated by Wilcomb E. Washburn's The Governor and the Rebel (1957). Rather than singing Bacon's praises and chastising Berkeley's tyranny, Washburn found the roots of the rebellion in the colonists' intolerable demand to "authorize the slaughter and dispossession of the innocent as well as the guilty."

More nuanced approaches on Berkeley's supposed tyranny or mismanagement entertained specialist historians throughout the middle of the twentieth century, leading to a diversification of factors responsible for Virginia's contemporary instability. Wesley Frank Craven in the 1968 publication, The Colonies in Transition, argues that Berkeley's greatest failings took place during the revolt, near the end of his life.  Bernard Bailyn pushed the novel thesis that it was a question of access to resources, a failure to fully transplant Old World society to New.

Edmund S. Morgan's 1975 classic, American Slavery, American Freedom: The Ordeal of Colonial Virginia, connected the calamity of Bacon's Rebellion, namely the potential for lower-class revolt, with the colony's transition over to slavery, saying, "But for those with eyes to see, there was an obvious lesson in the rebellion. Resentment of an alien race might be more powerful than resentment of an upper class. Virginians did not immediately grasp it. It would sink in as time went on."

James Rice's 2012 narrative, Tales from a Revolution: Bacon's Rebellion and the Transformation of Early America, whose emphasis on Bacon's flaws echoes The Governor and the Rebel, integrates the rebellion into a larger story emphasizing the actions of multiple Native Americans, as well as placing it in the context of politics in Europe. In this telling, the climax of Bacon's Rebellion comes with the "Glorious Revolution" of 1688/89.

Legacy 
According to the Historic Jamestowne website, "For many years, historians considered the Virginia Rebellion of 1676 to be the first stirring of revolutionary sentiment in [North] America, which culminated in the American Revolution almost exactly one hundred years later. However, in the past few decades, based on findings from a more distant viewpoint, historians have come to understand Bacon's Rebellion as a power struggle between two stubborn, selfish leaders rather than a glorious fight against tyranny."

Nonetheless, many in the early United States, including Thomas Jefferson, saw Bacon as a patriot and believed that Bacon's Rebellion truly was a prelude to the later American Revolution against the control of the Crown. This understanding of the conflict was reflected in 20th-century commemorations, including a memorial window in Colonial Williamsburg and a prominent tablet in the Virginia House of Delegates chamber of the State Capitol in Richmond, which recalls Bacon as "A great Patriot Leader of the Virginia People who died while defending their rights October 26, 1676." Subsequent to the rebellion, the Virginia colonial legislature enacted the Virginia Slave Codes of 1705, which created several strict laws upon people of African background. Additionally, the codes were intended to socially segregate the white and black races.

Use of jimsonweed 
Jimsonweed is a hallucination inducing plant that was first documented by a Virginian colonist named Robert Beverly. Robert Beverley reported, in his 1705 book on the history of Virginia, that some soldiers who had been dispatched to Jamestown to quell Bacon's Rebellion gathered and ate leaves of Datura stramonium and spent eleven days acting in bizarre and foolish ways before recovering. After recovery from the plant the soldiers claimed to not remember anything from the past 11 days. This led to the plant being known as Jamestown weed, and later jimsonweed.

Described as a "cooler" by Robert Beverley but effects can be close to schizophrenia and dissociative disorder - which explains why soldiers acted irrationally, or "went crazy" for days.

See also 
 Cockacoeske, Pamunkey chief
 Queen Ann (Pamunkey chief)
 Bacon's Castle
* Culpeper's Rebellion

References

Further reading 
 Allen, Theodore W. The Invention of the White Race, Vol. 2: The Origins of Racial Oppression in Anglo-America. London: Verso (1997).
 Billings, Warren M. "The Causes of Bacon's Rebellion: Some Suggestions," Virginia Magazine of History and Biography, 1970, Vol. 78 Issue 4, pp. 409–435
 Cave, Alfred A. "Lethal Encounters: Englishmen and Indians in Colonial Virginia" (University of Nebraska Press, 2011)  pp. 147–165
 Cullen, Joseph P. "Bacon's Rebellion," American History Illustrated, Dec 1968, Vol. 3 Issue 8, p. 4 ff.
 Rice, James D. "Bacon's Rebellion in Indian Country," Journal of American History, vol. 101, no. 3 (Dec. 2014), pp. 726–750.
 Tarter, Brent. "Bacon's Rebellion, the Grievances of the People, and the Political Culture of Seventeenth-Century Virginia," Virginia Magazine of History & Biography (2011) 119#1 pp 1–41.
 Thompson, Peter. "The Thief, the Householder, and the Commons: Languages of Class in Seventeenth-Century Virginia," William & Mary Quarterly (2006) 63#2 pp 253–280 in JSTOR
 
 Wertenbaker, Thomas Jefferson. Torchbearer of the Revolution: The Story of Bacon's Rebellion and its Leader (Princeton University Press, 1940)
 Washburn, Wilcomb E. The Governor and the Rebel: A History of Bacon's Rebellion in Virginia (University of North Carolina Press for the Institute of Early American History and Culture, 1957)

* Wiseman, Samuel. Book of Record: The Official Account of Bacon's Rebellion in Virginia, 1676–1677 (2006)

External links 

Bacon's Rebellion at Encyclopedia Virginia

Conflicts in 1676
1676 in the Thirteen Colonies
Rebellions against the British Empire
Colony of Virginia
Military history of the Thirteen Colonies
Colonial American and Indian wars
Native American history of Virginia
17th-century rebellions
1676 in Virginia
Jamestown, Virginia
Slave rebellions in North America